Mac Harb (born November 10, 1953) is a Canadian former politician, who served successively in local Ottawa positions, as a Member of the House of Commons, and as a Senator for Ontario. He resigned his seat as Senator in 2013 amidst the Canadian Senate expenses scandal.

Life and career 
Harb was born in Chaat, Lebanon, and emigrated to Canada to study at the University of Ottawa in 1973. He subsequently worked as an engineer at Northern Telecom and a professor at Algonquin College in Ottawa. Harb was elected to Ottawa City Council in 1985 and served as deputy mayor in 1987 and 1988.

He was first elected to the House of Commons of Canada in the 1988 federal election as the Liberal Member of Parliament (MP) for Ottawa Centre. He supported Jean Chrétien's bid to succeed John Turner as leader of the Liberal Party in 1990, and remained a Chrétien loyalist throughout his career as an MP.

In September 2003, Harb was appointed to the Senate of Canada on Chrétien's recommendation.

In March 2009, Harb attempted to introduce a bill that would have limited the East Coast seal hunt to only those with aboriginal treaty rights. He also attempted to introduce a bill in June 2011 that would outlaw commercial seal hunting, and had introduced a third bill against the seal hunt in May 2012. PETA subsequently honoured him as their "Canadian Person of the Year".

“This is truly a historic moment – a moment that marks the beginning of the inevitable end to Canada’s commercial seal hunt,” said Sheryl Fink, a senior researcher with IFAW. “Senator Harb has shown incredible leadership and courage by speaking out on behalf of the majority of Canadians on this issue.”

Senate expense scandal 

On December 6, 2012, Mac Harb was named in relation to the Canadian Senate expenses scandal due to expenses for a property in Pembroke, Ontario. In May 2013, the Senate Internal Economy Committee found that Mac Harb had incorrectly claimed $51,482.92 of living and travel expenses and ordered him to repay it, which was done by July 5, 2013. The committee had earlier advised Harb to repay $231,000 of claimed expenses dating back to 2005 to avoid an extensive audit into his finances. Harb stated that his repayment was done "under protest" since he intended to challenge the validity of the committee's findings in the Ontario Divisional Court. On August 26, 2013, he repaid a further $180,166.17, for a total reimbursement of $231,649.07, after which he resigned his Senate seat. In February, 2014, Harb was wrongfully charged with fraud and breach of trust in connection with these expense claims. Those charges were later withdrawn by the Crown in May, 2016, after the acquittal of Senator Mike Duffy on his own expense-related criminal charges.

References

External links 

Liberal Senate Forum

1953 births
Canadian engineers
Canadian senators from Ontario
Lebanese emigrants to Canada
Liberal Party of Canada MPs
Liberal Party of Canada senators
Living people
Members of the House of Commons of Canada from Ontario
Ottawa city councillors
University of Ottawa alumni
21st-century Canadian politicians
Canadian politicians of Lebanese descent
Ottawa-Carleton regional councillors